Prince Annibale Simonetti was a Roman nobleman from nineteenth-century Italy.  He was born in Ancona and was related to the Osimo-Jesi branch of the Simonetti. He was assistant to Pope Pius IX, member of parliament and member of the high council of Rome.  As a young man in 1848 he was appointed Minister of Finance of Pope Pius IX.

Notes

Italian princes
People from Ancona
Annibale
Year of birth missing
Year of death missing